The major of rivers of Andhra Pradesh are Godavari River and Krishna River. The coastline of Andhra Pradesh has a length of 975 km (606 mi), the second-longest coastline in India after Gujarat.

List 
 Krishna River
 Godavari River
 Penna River
 Tungabhadra River
 Vamsadhara River
 Vedavathi River
 Swarnamukhi River
 Veda River
 Avathi River
 Jayamangali River
 Chitravathi River
 Sagileru River
 Cheyyeru River
 Kundu River
 Maldevi River
 Papagni River
 Kunderu River
 Bahuda River
 Puncha River
 Mahendratanaya River
 Nagavali River
 Sileru River
 Arani River
 Bendi Gedda
 Bahuda River
 Budameru River
 Champavathi River
 Garibula Gedda
 Galeru River
 Gosthani River
 Gundlakamma River
 Kinnerasani River
 Kandaleru River
 Kandivalasa River
 Kalangi River
 Koringa River
 Kundu River
 Madala River
 Manneru River
 Munneru River
 Murredu River
 Nadari River
 Kosasthalaiyar River
 Narava Gedda
 Palar River
 Paleru River
 Pedda Gedda
 Pedda Vagu
 Ponnaiyar River
 Sabari River
 Sarada River
 Swarnamukhi River
 Tammileru River
 Tandava River
 Varaha River
 Vedavathi River
 Yeleru River
 Yerrakaluva

See also 
 List of rivers of India

Andhra Pradesh-related lists
Lists of rivers of India
Rivers of India